The 2018 Adur District Council elections took place on 3 May 2018 to elect members of Adur District Council in West Sussex, England. The election saw half of the Council's 29 seats up for election, and resulted in the Conservative Party retaining their majority on the council. Labour gained 4 seats to replace UKIP as the official opposition on the Council, who lost all the seats they were defending from 2014.

Results

By ward

References

2018
2018 English local elections
2010s in West Sussex